Kathy Anderson (born November 3, 1986) is an artist, on-camera personality and videographer. Currently she works as a freelance videographer and editor in Toronto.

Childhood 
Anderson was born in Canada.  She took to drama at a young age, and went on to earn a BFA in Acting from Ryerson, University.

Early life 
Anderson received acclaim for her 2008 Toronto Fringe Festival production, Gameshow: The Musical, which she wrote and composed. The production won "Best of Fringe" (2008) earning an extended run at Diesel Playhouse, after being met with mixed reviews from press.

Career 
Anderson's web series "Puck My Balls" was praised by Sports Illustrated, NBC, and The Huffington Post, In 2011, she was awarded a "Slammie" from NBA.com for her Blake Griffin tribute video.

This recognition earned Anderson a contract with the MLB Advanced Media, where she created videos featuring the Toronto Blue Jays. She currently works for Canucks Sports & Entertainment.

References 

Canadian television personalities
Canadian YouTubers
Canadian women cinematographers
People from Perth County, Ontario
21st-century Canadian actresses
Toronto Metropolitan University alumni
Living people
Canadian women television personalities
1986 births